is a city located in Kōchi Prefecture, Japan. , the city had an estimated population of 12,121 in 7079 households and a population density of 49 persons per km2.

Geography
Muroto is located in the southeastern tip of Kōchi Prefecture on the island of Shikoku. It occupies Cape Muroto which juts out into the Pacific Ocean. Parts of the city are within the borders of the Muroto-Anan Kaigan Quasi-National Park. The entire territory of Muroto is "Muroto Global Geopark" which is a member of the Japanese Geoparks Network and Global Geoparks Network since 2011 on account of its outstanding geological heritage, educational programs and projects, and promotion of geotourism.

Geology
Cape Muroto is made up of Oligocene to Pleistocene-aged sedimentary rocks and loose Holocene-aged alluvial deposits. The rocks belong to the Shimanto Supergroup, represented in the peninsula as mudstone, and the Tonohama Group made up of chiefly of sandstone and gravel. Several active, WNW-dipping, thrust faults are exposed at the western coast and southern tip of the peninsula. Off-shore west of the Cape Muroto, tip of the peninsula, there faults dips to the west.

There are uplifted marine terraces at Muroto. Dating of these terraces reveal that since their formation in an interval 123 to 96 thousand years ago (k B.P.), in an epoch corresponding to the Eemian interglacial. Since then land in the tip of the peninsula has risen 1.2–1.6  meters every thousand years (m/kyr). Closer to the mainland the uplift rate has been in the order of 0.3–0.7 m/kyr. While these are long-term averages individual large non-megathrust earthquakes are known to have uplifted the coast around one meter. These earthquakes are more rare than megathrust ones occurring every 1000 to 2000 years. Uplift of the coast has left fossil tube worm colonies attached to rocks on land.

Neighbouring municipalities 
Kōchi Prefecture
 Tōyō
 Nahari
 Kitagawa

Climate
Muroto has a humid subtropical climate (Köppen climate classification Cfa) with hot, humid summers and cool winters. There is significant precipitation throughout the year, especially during June and July.

Demographics
Per Japanese census data, the population of Muroto in 2020 is 11,742 people. Muroto has been conducting censuses since 1920.

History 
As with all of Kōchi Prefecture, the area of Muroto was part of ancient Tosa Province.  During the Edo period, the area was part of the holdings of Tosa Domain ruled by the Yamauchi clan from their seat at Kōchi Castle. Following the Meiji restoration, the village of Muroto was established within Aki District, Kōchi with the creation of the modern municipalities system on October 1, 1889. In 1934, a typhoon caused tremendous devastation, killing 3,000 people. Muroto merged with the towns of Murotomisaki, Kiragawa, Sakihama and Hane and was elevated to city status on March 1, 1951.

Government
Muroto has a mayor-council form of government with a directly elected mayor and a unicameral city council of 12 members. Muroto, together with the town of Tōyō, contributes one member to the Kōchi Prefectural Assembly. In terms of national politics, the city is part of Kōchi 1st district of the lower house of the Diet of Japan.

Economy
Commercial fishing dominates the local economy of Muroto. The city is suffering from depopulation due to the decline of the fishery industry.

Education
Muroto has five public elementary schools and four public middle schools operated by the city government and one public middle school operated by the Kōchi Prefectural Department of Education.

Transportation

Railway
Muroto has no passenger railway service. The nearest train station is Nahari Station on the Tosa Kuroshio Railways Asa Line. Plans to extend the line from Nahari to Muroto have been floated since 1971, but no action has been taken.

Highways

Local attractions
 Cape Muroto
Hotsumisaki-ji, 24th temple on the Shikoku Pilgrimage
Shinshō-ji, 25th temple on the Shikoku Pilgrimage
Kongōchō-ji, 26th temple on the Shikoku Pilgrimage

References

External links

 
 Muroto Global Geopark in English
 Muroto-Anan Coast Quasi-National Park in English
 

Cities in Kōchi Prefecture
Global Geoparks Network members
Geoparks in Japan
Populated coastal places in Japan
Muroto, Kōchi